Calidifontibacillus azotoformans is a Gram-positive, aerobic endospore-forming, rod-shaped and motile bacterium from the genus of Calidifontibacillus which has been isolated from water of a hot spring.

References

Bacillaceae
Bacteria described in 2020